Alphonse Desjardins, PC (6 May 1841 – 4 June 1912) was born in Terrebonne, Quebec and was mayor of Montreal from 1893 to 1894 and later a Canadian cabinet minister.  He married Virginie Paré in 1864 and remarried Hortense Barsalou in 1880.

He was a lawyer, journalist, businessman and politician.  He owned a tile factory and participated in the founding of the Banque Jacques-Cartier, which later became part of the National Bank of Canada.  He represented the riding of Hochelaga in the House of Commons for 18 years, serving as a cabinet minister and Minister of Militia and Defence for a few months at the end of the Mackenzie Bowell government and then the short-lived Tupper government in 1896.  He was named a senator in 1892.  He became mayor of Montreal from 1893–1894.  For a time he held all three posts (member of the House of Commons, Senator, mayor) simultaneously.

In 1872, he was created a Knight of the Order of Pius IX in acknowledgment of his services to the Catholic Church.

Electoral record

Gallery

References
 
 
 Gaétan Frigon: Alphonse Desjardins, lawyer, banker and politician, section in: Prudent Beaudry and other pioneering Quebec businessmen, in Legacy. How french Canadians shaped North America. McClelland & Stewart, Toronto 2016; repr. 2019  p 74 sqq (in French: Bâtisseurs d'Amérique: Des canadiens français qui ont faite de l'histoire. Dir. André Pratte, Jonathan Kay. La Presse, Montréal 2016)

1841 births
1912 deaths
Lawyers in Quebec
Canadian senators from Quebec
Conservative Party of Canada (1867–1942) MPs
Conservative Party of Canada (1867–1942) senators
Knights of the Order of Pope Pius IX
Mayors of Montreal
Members of the House of Commons of Canada from Quebec
Members of the King's Privy Council for Canada
People from Terrebonne, Quebec